The flag of the state of Michigan is a coat of arms set on a dark blue field, as set forth by Michigan state law. (The Governor has a variant of the flag with a white instead of blue field.) The state has an official flag month from June 14 through July 14.

Design

The state coat of arms depicts a blue shield, upon which the sun rises over a lake and peninsula, and a man with a raised hand representing peace and holding a long gun representing the fight for state and nation as a frontier state.

As supporters, the elk and moose are derived from the Hudson's Bay Company coat of arms, and depict great animals of Michigan. The bald eagle represents the United States which formed the state of Michigan from the Northwest Territory.

The design features three Latin mottos. From top-to-bottom they are:
On red ribbon: "E Pluribus Unum," means "Out of many, one," a motto of the United States.
On light blue shield: "Tuebor," means "I will defend."
On white ribbon: "Si Quæris Peninsulam Amœnam Circumspice," means "If you seek a pleasant peninsula, look about you." (The official state motto).

It is one of eight U.S. state flags to feature an eagle, alongside those of Illinois, Iowa, New York, North Dakota, Oregon, Pennsylvania and Utah.

History
The present flag, adopted in 1911, is the third state flag. The first flag featured a portrait of Michigan's first governor, Stevens T. Mason, on one side and the state coat of arms on the other side. The first flag is completely lost, and no images of it exist, as far as anyone knows. The second flag, adopted in 1865, displayed the state coat of arms on one side and the United States coat of arms on the other.

The North American Vexillological Association (NAVA), in its 2001 survey of U.S. state, U.S. territorial, and Canadian provincial flags rated the current Michigan flag 59th out of 72 flags evaluated. The survey respondents gave an average score of just 3.46 out of a possible 10 points.

In November 2016, a bill was introduced in the Michigan state legislature by Michigan State Senator Steven Bieda that would have provided for a flag commission to head up a public design contest to change the current state flag, but it was ultimately unsuccessful. If the bill had passed, however, the current state flag would have been discontinued in January 2019 and replaced with a new design.

Pledge
Michigan's pledge of allegiance to the state flag was written by Harold G. Coburn and was officially adopted in 1972.

See also

Flags of the Governors of the U.S. States
State of Michigan
Symbols of the State of Michigan
Great Seal of the State of Michigan

References

External links
The State of Michigan
The Michigan State Flag

Michigan
Symbols of Michigan
Flags of Michigan
Michigan